Alexander Kinloch Brewster (born 3 May 1954) is a former rugby union player who gained six caps for the Scotland national rugby union team. He played as a prop for Stewart's Melville RFC.

Early life
Brewster was born on 3 May 1954 in Dechmont, West Lothian. He was educated at Melville College in Edinburgh.

Rugby Union career

Amateur career

Brewster captained Stewart’s Melville FPs.

Provincial career

Brewster captained Edinburgh District.

He played for the Reds Trial side in their match against Blues Trial on 3 January 1987.

International career

Brewster's first international appearance was against England at Twickenham on 15 January 1977. This was his first as three caps as flanker. He returned to the international side in 1985 as tight head and won a further three caps, with his last cap playing against Romania at Bucharest on 29 March 1986.

He played a match for the Barbarians in 1988. He captained the Scotland team that toured Japan in 1989 although full caps were not awarded.

References

External links
 

1954 births
Living people
Rugby union props
Rugby union flankers
Scotland international rugby union players
People educated at Stewart's Melville College
Stewart's Melville RFC players
Barbarian F.C. players
Edinburgh District (rugby union) players
Reds Trial players
Rugby union players from West Lothian